The serpent, or snake, is one of the oldest and most widespread mythological symbols. The word is derived from Latin serpens, a crawling animal or snake. Snakes have been associated with some of the oldest rituals known to mankind and represent dual expression of good and evil.

In some cultures, snakes were fertility symbols. For example, the Hopi people of North America performed an annual snake dance to celebrate the union of Snake Youth (a Sky spirit) and Snake Girl (an Underworld spirit) and to renew the fertility of Nature. During the dance, live snakes were handled, and at the end of the dance the snakes were released into the fields to guarantee good crops. "The snake dance is a prayer to the spirits of the clouds, the thunder and the lightning, that the rain may fall on the growing crops." To the Hopi, snakes symbolized the umbilical cord, joining all humans to Mother Earth. The Great Goddess often had snakes as her familiars—sometimes twining around her sacred staff, as in ancient Crete—and they were worshiped as guardians of her mysteries of birth and regeneration.

Evolutionary origins
The anthropologist Lynn Isbell has argued that, as primates, the serpent as a symbol of death is built into our unconscious minds because of our evolutionary history. Isbell argues that for millions of years snakes were the only significant predators of primates, and that this explains why fear of snakes is one of the most common phobias worldwide and why the symbol of the serpent is so prevalent in world mythology; the serpent is an innate image of danger and death.

Furthermore, the psychoanalyst Joseph Lewis Henderson and the ethnologist Maude Oakes have argued that the serpent is a symbol of initiation and rebirth precisely because it is a symbol of death.

Using phylogenetical and statistical methods on related motifs from folklore and myth, French comparativist Julien d'Huy managed to reconstruct a possible archaic narrative about the serpent. In this Paleolithic "ophidian" myth, snakes are connected to rains and storms, and even to water sources. In regards to the latter, it blocks rivers and other water sources in exchange for human sacrifices and/or material good offerings.

Values

Fertility and rebirth
Historically, serpents and snakes represent fertility or a creative life force. As snakes shed their skin through sloughing, they are symbols of rebirth, transformation, immortality, and healing. The ouroboros is a symbol of eternity and continual renewal of life.

In some Abrahamic traditions, the serpent represents sexual desire. According to some interpretations of the Midrash, the serpent represents sexual passion. In Hinduism, Kundalini is a coiled serpent.

Guardianship

Serpents are represented as potent guardians of temples and other sacred spaces. This connection may be grounded in the observation that when threatened, some snakes (such as rattlesnakes or cobras) frequently hold and defend their ground, first resorting to threatening display and then fighting, rather than retreat. Thus, they are natural guardians of treasures or sacred sites which cannot easily be moved out of harm's way.

At Angkor in Cambodia, numerous stone sculptures present hooded multi-headed nāgas as guardians of temples or other premises. A favorite motif of Angkorean sculptors from approximately the 12th century CE onward was that of the Buddha, sitting in the position of meditation, his weight supported by the coils of a multi-headed nāga that also uses its flared hood to shield him from above. This motif recalls the story of the Buddha and the serpent king Mucalinda: as the Buddha sat beneath a tree engrossed in meditation, Mucalinda came up from the roots of the tree to shield the Buddha from a tempest that was just beginning to arise.

The Gadsden flag of the American Revolution depicts a rattlesnake coiled up and poised to strike. Below the image of the snake is the legend, "Don't tread on me." The snake symbolized the dangerousness of colonists willing to fight for their rights and homeland, and was also symbolic of their separation from Europe, as it was an animal unique to America. The motif is repeated in the First Navy Jack of the US Navy.

Venom and medicine
Serpents are connected with venom and medicine. The snake's venom is associated with the chemicals of plants and fungi that have the power to either heal or provide expanded consciousness (and even the elixir of life and immortality) through divine intoxication. Because of its herbal knowledge and entheogenic association, the snake was often considered one of the wisest animals, being (close to the) divine. Its divine aspect combined with its habitat in the earth between the roots of plants made it an animal with chthonic properties connected to the afterlife and immortality. The deified Greek physician Asclepius, as god of medicine and healing, carried a staff with one serpent wrapped around it, which has become the symbol of modern medicine. Moses also had a replica of a serpent on a pole, the Nehushtan, mentioned in Numbers 21:8.

Associated animals

Chthonic serpents and sacred trees

In many myths, the chthonic serpent (sometimes a pair) lives in or is coiled around a Tree of Life situated in a divine garden. In the Genesis story of the Torah and biblical Old Testament, the tree of the knowledge of good and evil is situated in the Garden of Eden together with the tree of life and the serpent. In Greek mythology, Ladon coiled around the tree in the garden of the Hesperides protecting the golden apples.

Similarly Níðhöggr (Nidhogg Nagar), the dragon of Norse mythology, eats from the roots of the Yggdrasil, the World Tree.

Under yet another tree (the Bodhi Tree of Enlightenment), the Buddha sat in ecstatic meditation. When a storm arose, the mighty serpent king Mucalinda rose up from his place beneath the earth and enveloped the Buddha in seven coils for seven days, so as not to break his ecstatic state.

The Vision Serpent was a symbol of rebirth in Maya mythology, with origins going back to earlier Maya conceptions, lying at the center of the world as the Mayans conceived it. "It is in the center axis atop the World Tree. Essentially the World Tree and the Vision Serpent, representing the king, created the center axis which communicates between the spiritual and the earthly worlds or planes. It is through ritual that the king could bring the center axis into existence in the temples and create a doorway to the spiritual world, and with it power."

Sometimes the Tree of Life is represented (in a combination with similar concepts such as the World Tree and Axis mundi or "World Axis") by a staff such as those used by shamans. Examples of such staffs featuring coiled snakes in mythology are the caduceus of Hermes, the Rod of Asclepius, the Staff of Moses, and the papyrus reeds and deity poles entwined by a single serpent Wadjet, dating to earlier than 3000 BCE. The oldest known representation of two snakes entwined around a rod is that of the Sumerian fertility god Ningizzida, who was sometimes depicted as a serpent with a human head, eventually becoming a god of healing and magic. It is the companion of Dumuzi (Tammuz), with whom it stood at the gate of heaven. In the Louvre, there is a famous green steatite vase carved for King Gudea of Lagash (dated variously 2200–2025 BCE) with an inscription dedicated to Ningizzida. Ningizzida was the ancestor of Gilgamesh, who, according to the epic, dived to the bottom of the waters to retrieve the plant of life. But while he rested from his labor, a serpent came and ate the plant. The snake became immortal, and Gilgamesh was destined to die.

Ningizzida has been popularized in the 20th century by Raku Kei (Reiki, a.k.a. "The Way of the Fire Dragon"), where "Nin Giz Zida" is believed to be a fire serpent of Tibetan rather than Sumerian origin. "Nin Giz Zida" is another name for the ancient Hindu concept Kundalini, a Sanskrit word meaning either "coiled up" or "coiling like a snake". "Kundalini" refers to the mothering intelligence behind yogic awakening and spiritual maturation leading to altered states of consciousness. There are a number of other translations of the term, usually emphasizing a more serpentine nature to the word—e.g. "serpent power". It has been suggested by Joseph Campbell that the symbol of snakes coiled around a staff is an ancient representation of Kundalini physiology. The staff represents the spinal column, with the snake(s) being energy channels. In the case of two coiled snakes, they usually cross each other seven times, a possible reference to the seven energy centers called chakras.

In Ancient Egypt, where the earliest written cultural records exist, the serpent appears from the beginning to the end of their mythology. Ra and Atum ("he who completes or perfects") became the same god, Atum, the "counter-Ra", associated with earth animals, including the serpent: Nehebkau ("he who harnesses the souls") was the two-headed serpent deity who guarded the entrance to the underworld. He is often seen as the son of the snake goddess Renenutet. She often was confused with (and later was absorbed by) their primal snake goddess Wadjet, the Egyptian cobra, who from the earliest of records was the patron and protector of the country, all other deities, and the pharaohs. Hers is the first known oracle. She was depicted as the crown of Egypt, entwined around the staff of papyrus and the pole that indicated the status of all other deities, as well as having the all-seeing eye of wisdom and vengeance. She never lost her position in the Egyptian pantheon.

The image of the serpent as the embodiment of the wisdom transmitted by Sophia was an emblem used by gnosticism, especially those sects that the more orthodox characterized as "Ophites" ("Serpent People"). The chthonic serpent was one of the earth-animals associated with the cult of Mithras. The basilisk, the venomous "king of serpents" with the glance that kills, was hatched by a serpent, Pliny the Elder and others thought, from the egg of a cock.

Outside Eurasia, in Yoruba mythology, Oshunmare was another mythic regenerating serpent.

The Rainbow Serpent (also known as the Rainbow Snake) is a major mythological being for Aboriginal people across Australia, although the creation myths associated with it are best known from northern Australia. In Fiji, Ratumaibulu was a serpent god who ruled the underworld and made fruit trees bloom. In the Northern Flinders Ranges reigns the Arkaroo, a serpent who drank Lake Frome empty, refuges into the mountains, carving valleys and waterholes, earthquakes through snoring.

Cosmic serpents

The serpent, when forming a ring with its tail in its mouth, is a clear and widespread symbol of the "All-in-All", the totality of existence, infinity and the cyclic nature of the cosmos. The most well known version of this is the Aegypto-Greek ourobouros. It is believed to have been inspired by the Milky Way, as some ancient texts refer to a serpent of light residing in the heavens. The Ancient Egyptians associated it with Wadjet, one of their oldest deities, as well as another aspect, Hathor. In Norse mythology the World Serpent (or Midgard serpent) known as Jörmungandr encircled the world in the ocean's abyss biting its own tail.

In Hindu mythology Lord Vishnu is said to sleep while floating on the cosmic waters on the serpent Shesha. In the Puranas Shesha holds all the planets of the universe on his hoods and constantly sings the glories of Vishnu from all his mouths. He is sometimes referred to as "Ananta-Shesha," which means "Endless Shesha". In the Samudra manthan chapter of the Puranas, Shesha loosens Mount Mandara for it to be used as a churning rod by the Asuras and Devas to churn the ocean of milk in the heavens in order to make Soma (or Amrita), the divine elixir of immortality. As a churning rope another giant serpent called Vasuki is used.

In pre-Columbian Central America Quetzalcoatl was sometimes depicted as biting its own tail. The mother of Quetzalcoatl was the Aztec goddess Coatlicue ("the one with the skirt of serpents"), also known as Cihuacoatl ("The Lady of the serpent"). Quetzalcoatl's father was Mixcoatl ("Cloud Serpent"). He was identified with the Milky Way, the stars, and the heavens in several Mesoamerican cultures.

The demigod Aidophedo of the West African Ashanti people is also a serpent biting its own tail. In Dahomey mythology of Benin in West Africa, the serpent that supports everything on its many coils was named Dan. In the Vodou of Benin and Haiti, Ayida-Weddo (a.k.a. Aida-Wedo, Aido Quedo, "Rainbow-Serpent") is a spirit of fertility, rainbows and snakes, and a companion or wife to Dan, the father of all spirits. As Vodou was exported to Haiti through the slave trade, Dan became Danballah, Damballah or Damballah-Wedo. Because of his association with snakes, he is sometimes disguised as Moses, who carried a snake on his staff. He is also thought by many to be the same entity of Saint Patrick, known as a snake banisher.

The serpent Hydra is a star constellation representing either the serpent thrown angrily into the sky by Apollo or the Lernaean Hydra as defeated by Heracles for one of his Twelve Labors. The constellation Serpens represents a snake being tamed by Ophiuchus the snake-handler, another constellation. The most probable interpretation is that Ophiuchus represents the healer Asclepius.

Dragons

Occasionally, serpents and dragons are used interchangeably, having similar symbolic functions. The venom of the serpent is thought to have a fiery quality similar to a fire-breathing dragon. The Greek Ladon and the Norse Níðhöggr (Nidhogg Nagar) are sometimes described as serpents and sometimes as dragons. In Germanic mythology, "serpent" (Old English: wyrm, Old High German: wurm, Old Norse: ormr) is used interchangeably with the Greek borrowing "dragon" (OE: draca, OHG: trahho, ON: dreki). In China and especially in Indochina, the Indian serpent nāga was equated with the lóng or Chinese dragon. The Aztec and Toltec serpent god Quetzalcoatl also has dragon-like wings, like its equivalent in K'iche' Maya mythology Q'uq'umatz ("feathered serpent"), which had previously existed since Classic Maya times as the deity named Kukulkan.

Mythology and religion

African mythology

In Africa the chief centre of serpent worship was Dahomey, but the cult of the python seems to have been of exotic origin, dating back to the first quarter of the 17th century. By the conquest of Whydah the Dahomeyans were brought in contact with a people of serpent worshipers, and ended by adopting from them the beliefs which they at first despised. At Whydah, the chief centre, there is a serpent temple, tenanted by some fifty snakes. Every python of the danh-gbi kind must be treated with respect, and death is the penalty for killing one, even by accident. Danh-gbi has numerous wives, who until 1857 took part in a public procession from which the profane crowd was excluded; a python was carried round the town in a hammock, perhaps as a ceremony for the expulsion of evils.

The rainbow-god of the Ashanti was also conceived to have the form of a snake. His messenger was said to be a small variety of boa, but only certain individuals, not the whole species, were sacred.

In many parts of Africa the serpent is looked upon as the incarnation of deceased relatives. Among the Amazulu, as among the Betsileo of Madagascar, certain species are assigned as the abode of certain classes. The Maasai, on the other hand, regard each species as the habitat of a particular family of the tribe.

Ancient Near East

In ancient Mesopotamia, Nirah, the messenger god of Ištaran, was represented as a serpent on kudurrus, or boundary stones. Representations of two intertwined serpents are common in Sumerian art and Neo-Sumerian artwork and still appear sporadically on cylinder seals and amulets until as late as the thirteenth century BCE. The horned viper (Cerastes cerastes) appears in Kassite and Neo-Assyrian kudurrus and is invoked in Assyrian texts as a magical protective entity. A dragon-like creature with horns, the body and neck of a snake, the forelegs of a lion, and the hind-legs of a bird appears in Mesopotamian art from the Akkadian period until the Hellenistic period (323 BCE–31 BCE). This creature, known in Akkadian as the mušḫuššu, meaning "furious serpent", was used as a symbol for particular deities and also as a general protective emblem. It seems to have originally been the attendant of the underworld god Ninazu, but later became the attendant to the Hurrian storm-god Tishpak, as well as, later, Ninazu's son Ningishzida, the Babylonian national god Marduk, the scribal god Nabu, and the Assyrian national god Ashur.

Snake cults were well established in Canaanite religion in the Bronze Age, for archaeologists have uncovered serpent cult objects in Bronze Age strata at several pre-Israelite cities in Canaan: two at Megiddo, one at Gezer, one in the sanctum sanctorum of the Area H temple at Hazor, and two at Shechem.

In the surrounding region, serpent cult objects figured in other cultures. A late Bronze Age Hittite shrine in northern Syria contained a bronze statue of a god holding a serpent in one hand and a staff in the other. In 6th-century Babylon, a pair of bronze serpents flanked each of the four doorways of the temple of Esagila. At the Babylonian New Year's festival, the priest was to commission from a woodworker, a metalworker and a goldsmith two images, one of which "shall hold in its left hand a snake of cedar, raising its right [hand] to the god Nabu". At the tell of Tepe Gawra, at least seventeen Early Bronze Age Assyrian bronze serpents were recovered.<ref>E.A. Speiser, Excavations at Tepe Gawra: I. Levels I-VIII, p. 114ff., noted in Joines 1968:246 and note 9.</ref>

Bronze and Iron Age United Arab Emirates

Significant finds of pottery, bronze-ware and even gold depictions of snakes have been made throughout the United Arab Emirates (UAE). The Bronze Age and Iron Age metallurgical centre of Saruq Al Hadid has yielded probably the richest trove of such objects, although finds have been made bearing snake symbols in Bronze Age sites at Rumailah, Bithnah and Masafi. Most of the depictions of snakes are similar, with a consistent dotted decoration applied to them.

Although the widespread depiction of snakes in sites across the UAE is thought by archaeologists to have a religious purpose, this remains conjecture.

Abrahamic mythology

Judaic mythology

In the Hebrew Bible the serpent in the Garden of Eden lured Eve with the promise of being like God, tempting her that despite God's warning, death would not be the result, that God was withholding knowledge from her. Although the serpent is identified as Satan in the Book of Revelation, in Genesis the serpent is portrayed merely as a deceptive creature or trickster, promoting as good what God had directly forbidden, and particularly cunning in its deception (Gen. 3:4–5 and 3:22).

The staff of Moses transformed into a snake and then back into a staff (Exodus 4:2–4). The Book of Numbers 21:6–9 provides an origin for an archaic copper serpent, Nehushtan, by associating it with Moses. This copper snake according to the Biblical text is put on a pole and used for healing. Book of Numbers 21:9 "And Moses made a snake of copper, and put it upon a pole, and it came to pass, that if a snake had bitten any man, when he beheld the snake of brass, he lived."

When the reformer King Hezekiah came to the throne of Judah in the late 8th century BCE, "He removed the high places, broke the sacred pillars, smashed the idols, and broke into pieces the copper snake that Moses had made: for unto those days the children of Israel did burn incense to it: and he called it Nehushtan.

Christian mythology

In the Gospel of John 3:14–15, Jesus makes direct comparison between the raising up of the Son of Man and the act of Moses in raising up the serpent as a sign, using it as a symbol associated with salvation: "As Moses lifted up the serpent in the wilderness, even so must the Son of Man be lifted up, that whoever believes in Him should not perish but have eternal life".

Muslim mythology
The serpent is a recurrent motif in Islamic thought, appearing in both sacred texts and works of art. The creature is often seen as a symbol of evil. However, the serpent can also be seen as a positive figure. In Islamic tradition, the creature is often associated with wisdom and knowledge. In some works of Islamic art, the serpent is depicted as a guardian of the Quran, guarding the sacred text from harm. The serpent is a complex figure in Islamic thought, appearing as both a symbol of evil and a figure of wisdom. The creature provides a reminder of the dangers of temptation, but also represents the potential for knowledge and enlightenment.

Ancient Iran

Serpents are sacred and powerful in the thought of prehistoric cultures of Iran, having been portrayed as patrons of fertility, water and wealth in the ancient objects of Iran. They seem to have been worshipped along with the fertility goddesses from the fourth to first millennia BC, when their presence as mighty patrons and source of life and of immortality is seen in the art of Tall-i Bakun, Chogha Mish, Tepe Sialk, Jiroft culture, Shahr-e Sukhteh, Shahdad, Elamite art, Luristan art, etc.

However, it seems that the symbolic concept of the serpent was corrupted in the cultures of the Iranian plateau over time by Western influence. In Abrahamic traditions, the serpent represents sexual desire, as he lured Eve with the promise of forbidden knowledge in the Garden of Eden. As a result of such influence, Aryan religions call the serpents diabolic; Azhi Dahake in the Avesta is a scary serpent, and Zahhak in the Shahnameh is an infernal creature with two snakes on his shoulders. This replacement might be due to communication between the inhabitants of Iran and believers in Abrahamic religions, and beyond that the conversion of matriarchy into patriarchy as the social structure of Iranian plateau cultures.

Chinese mythology

In Chinese creationism mythology, Nüwa is the mother goddess who created humans from clay. She is depicted as a half snake being.

Greek mythology

The Minoan Snake Goddess brandished a serpent in either hand, perhaps evoking her role as source of wisdom, rather than her role as Mistress of the Animals (Potnia Theron), with a leopard under each arm.

Serpents figured prominently in archaic Greek myths. According to some sources, Ophion ("serpent", a.k.a. Ophioneus), ruled the world with Eurynome before the two of them were cast down by Cronus and Rhea. The oracles of the Ancient Greeks were said to have been the continuation of the tradition begun with the worship of the Egyptian cobra goddess Wadjet.

Typhon, the enemy of the Olympian gods, is described as a vast grisly monster with a hundred heads and a hundred serpents issuing from his thighs, who was conquered and cast into Tartarus by Zeus, or confined beneath volcanic regions, where he is the cause of eruptions. Typhon is thus the chthonic figuration of volcanic forces. Serpent elements figure among his offspring; among his children by Echidna are Cerberus (a monstrous three-headed dog with a snake for a tail and a serpentine mane); the serpent-tailed Chimaera; the serpent-like chthonic water beast Lernaean Hydra; and the hundred-headed serpentine dragon Ladon. Both the Lernaean Hydra and Ladon were slain by Heracles.

Python was the earth-dragon of Delphi. She always was represented in the vase-paintings and by sculptors as a serpent. Python was the chthonic enemy of Apollo, who slew her and remade her former home his own oracle, the most famous in Classical Greece.

Medusa and the other Gorgons were vicious female monsters with sharp fangs and hair of living, venomous snakes whose origins predate the written myths of Greece and who were the protectors of the most ancient ritual secrets. The Gorgons wore a belt of two intertwined serpents in the same configuration of the caduceus. The Gorgon was placed at the center, highest point of one of the pediments on the Temple of Artemis at Corfu.

Asclepius, the son of Apollo and Coronis, learned the secrets of keeping death at bay after observing one serpent bringing another (which Asclepius himself had fatally wounded) back to life with healing herbs. To prevent the entire human race from becoming immortal under Asclepius's care, Zeus killed him with a bolt of lightning. Asclepius' death at the hands of Zeus illustrates man's inability to challenge the natural order that separates mortal men from the gods. In honor of Asclepius, snakes were often used in healing rituals. Non-poisonous snakes were left to crawl on the floor in dormitories where the sick and injured slept. The Bibliotheca claimed that Athena gave Asclepius a vial of blood from the Gorgons. Gorgon blood had magical properties: if taken from the left side of the Gorgon, it was a fatal poison; from the right side, the blood was capable of bringing the dead back to life. However, Euripides wrote in his tragedy Ion that the Athenian queen Creusa had inherited this vial from her ancestor Erichthonios, who was a snake himself and had received the vial from Athena. In this version the blood of Medusa had the healing power while the lethal poison originated from Medusa's serpents.

Olympias, the mother of Alexander the Great and a princess of the primitive land of Epirus, had the reputation of a snake-handler, and it was in serpent form that Zeus was said to have fathered Alexander upon her. Aeëtes, the king of Colchis and father of the sorceress Medea, possessed the Golden Fleece. He guarded it with a massive serpent that never slept. Medea, who had fallen in love with Jason of the Argonauts, enchanted it to sleep so Jason could seize the Fleece. (See Lamia).

When not driven by horses, the chariot of the Greek sun god is described as being pulled by fiery draconic beings. The most notable instance of this is observed in the episode in which Medea is given her grandfather's chariot, which is pulled by serpents through the sky.

In artwork snakes are occasionally associated with Hecate, the goddess of witchcraft.

Hindu mythologyNaga (Sanskrit:नाग) is the Sanskrit/Pāli word for a deity or class of entity or being, taking the form of a very large snake, found in Hinduism, Buddhism and Jainism. The naga primarily represents rebirth, death and mortality, due to its casting of its skin and being symbolically "reborn".

Hindus associated naga with Shiva and with Vishnu, who rested on a 100-headed naga and coiled around Lord Shiva's neck. The snake represented freedom in Hindu mythology because they cannot be tamed. In Buddhism, the serpent Mucalinda is associated as the protector of Lord Buddha. In Jainism, serpent is associated with the 23rd Tirthankara Parshvanatha.

Nagas of Indochina
Serpents, or nāgas, play a particularly important role in Cambodian, Isan and Laotian mythology. An origin myth explains the emergence of the name "Cambodia" as resulting from conquest of a naga princess by a Kambuja lord named Kaundinya: the descendants of their union are the Khmer people. George Cœdès suggests the Cambodian myth is a basis for the legend of "Phra Daeng Nang Ai", in which a woman who has lived many previous lives in the region is reincarnated as a daughter of Phraya Khom (Thai for Cambodian) and causes the death of her companion in former lives who has been reincarnated as a prince of the Nagas. This leads to war between the "spirits of the air" and the Nagas: Nagas amok are rivers in spate, and the entire region is flooded. The Myth of the Toad King tells how introduction of Buddhist teachings led to war with the sky deity Phaya Thaen, and ended in a truce with nagas posted as guardians of entrances to temples.

Native American mythology

Some Native American tribes give reverence to the rattlesnake as grandfather and king of snakes who is able to give fair winds or cause tempest. Among the Hopi of Arizona the serpent figures largely in one of the dances. The rattlesnake was worshiped in the Natchez Temple of the Sun, and the Aztec deity Quetzalcoatl was a feathered serpent-god. In many Meso-American cultures, the serpent was regarded as a portal between two worlds. The tribes of Peru are said to have adored great snakes in the pre-Inca days, and in Chile the Mapuche made a serpent figure in their deluge beliefs.

A Horned Serpent is a popular image in Northern American natives' mythology.

In one Native North American story, an evil serpent kills one of the gods' cousins, so the god kills the serpent in revenge, but the dying serpent unleashes a great flood. People first flee to the mountains and then, when the mountains are covered, they float on a raft until the flood subsides. The evil spirits that the serpent god controlled then hide out of fear. The Mound Builders associated great mystical value to the serpent, as the Serpent Mound demonstrates, though we are unable to unravel the particular associations.

Nordic mythology

Jörmungandr, alternately referred to as the Midgard Serpent or World Serpent, is a sea serpent of Norse mythology, the middle child of Loki and the giantess Angrboða. According to the Prose Edda, Odin took Loki's three children, Fenrisúlfr, Hel and Jörmungandr. He tossed Jörmungandr into the great ocean that encircles Midgard. The serpent grew so big that he was able to surround the Earth and grasp his own tail, and as a result he earned the alternate name of the Midgard Serpent or World Serpent. Jörmungandr's arch enemy is the god Thor.

In the Poetic Edda, Odin tells of eight serpents gnawing on the roots of Yggdrasil: Nidhöggr, Gravvitnir, Moin, Goin, Grábakr, Grafvölluðr, Svafnir and Ofnir.

Folklore
In folk and fairy tale traditions all over the world, the serpent and the snake appear as characters in several fairy tales, either a main character in animal fables and magic tales (Märchen), or as the donor who grants the protagonist a special ability or impart him with some secret knowledge.

According to the Aarne-Thompson-Uther Index, the serpent can appear in this capacity in the following tale types:

 Aarne-Thompson-Uther Index tale type ATU 155, "The Ungrateful Animal (Serpent) Returned to Captivity": a farmer rescues an animal (snake) from a trap (pit). Now free, the animal wants to eat (bite) its saviour, who tries to delay this fate. He consults with other creatures and finally to a trickster animal (fox or jackal). The trickster animal feigns innocence and wants to understand the origin of the problem, so the ungrateful animal goes back to the pit to demonstrate. The farmer leaves the animal trapped again. Example: The Tiger, the Brahmin and the Jackal, Indian fable.
 Aarne-Thompson-Uther Index tale type ATU 411, "The King and the Lamia (The Snake-Wife)": a man takes to wife a woman of mysterious background. A holy person (hermit, cleric, monk) sees through the deception and reveals the woman's true nature as a serpent.Behr-Glinka, A.I. "Folk-Tale Type ATU411 in Eurasian Folk Tradition: Some Remarks to the “Typological Index of Folk-Tale Types” of H.-J. Uther" [Siuzhetnyi tip ATU411 v skazochnoi traditsiiEvrazii: nekoto rye zamechaniia k “Tipologicheskomu ukazateliu skazochnykh siuzhetov” H.-J. Utera]. Etnograficheskoe Obozrenie, 2018, no. 4, pp. 171–184.   This type would include Legend of the White Snake (Chinese legend); Mélusine, a French medieval legend.
 Aarne-Thompson-Uther Index tale type ATU 425, "The Search for the Lost Husband" and ATU 425A, "The Animal Bridegroom": a maiden is betrothed to an animal bridegroom (a snake, dragon or serpent, in several variants), who comes at night to the bridal bed in human form. The maiden breaks a taboo and her enchanted husband disappears. She is forced to seek him. Example: The Green Serpent, French literary fairy tale; The Snake Prince, Indian fairy tale; The Enchanted Snake, Italian literary fairy tale; The Serpent Prince, Hungarian folktale.
 Aarne-Thompson-Uther Index tale type ATU 425M, "The Snake as Bridegroom": a girl goes bathing and leaves her clothing by the shore. When she returns, a snake (grass snake) hides her clothing and will only return them if the girl agrees to marry it. She promises to marry the snake. Some time later, the grass snake comes to take its bride and bring her to its underwater (or underground) palace. This tale type seems to be restricted to the Baltic geographical area. Example: Egle the Queen of Serpents, a Lithuanian fairy tale.
 Aarne-Thompson-Uther Index tale type ATU 433B, "King Lindworm": a childless queen gives birth to a boy in snake form. Years later, he wishes to marry, but either devours his brides on their wedding night or cannot find a woman brave enough to accept his serpentine form. The snake prince is disenchanted by a maiden who wears layers of clothing in their nuptial night to mirror his layers of snakeskin. Example: King Lindworm, a Danish fairy tale.
 Aarne-Thompson-Uther Index tale type ATU 485, "Borma Jarizhka" or "The City of Babylon": a tsar sends a brave knight to the city of Babylon to retrieve three symbols of royal power (a robe, a crown, a scepter). The city is surrounded by snakes and ruled by a princess with snake-like attributes.
 Aarne-Thompson-Uther Index tale type ATU 560, "The Magic Ring": a poor man either buys or rescues four types of animals, a cat, a dog, a mouse and a snake. This snake is the son of the king of serpents. It takes the boy to its father's court to reward him a wish-granting object (usually a magic stone or ring). Example: The Enchanted Watch, French fairy tale.
 Aarne-Thompson-Uther Index tale type ATU 612, "The Three Snake-Leaves": a man kills a snake. Its mate brings three magical leaves to resurrect it. This inspires the man to find a similar herb to use on his deceased bride/wife.
 Aarne-Thompson-Uther Index tale type ATU 672, "The Serpent's Crown": a snake takes off its crown to bathe in the lake. The crown is stolen by a human, who discovers the crown can grant special abilities (most often, the knowledge of animal languages).
 Aarne-Thompson-Uther Index tale type ATU 673, "The White Serpent's Flesh": the main character learns the language of animals by eating the flesh of a white serpent. Example: The White Snake, German fairy tale by the Brothers Grimm.

Modern symbolism

Modern medicine

Snakes entwined the staffs both of Hermes (the caduceus) and of Asclepius, where a single snake entwined the rough staff. On Hermes' caduceus, the snakes were not merely duplicated for symmetry, they were paired opposites. (This motif is congruent with the phurba.) The wings at the head of the staff identified it as belonging to the winged messenger Hermes, the Roman Mercury, who was the god of magic, diplomacy and rhetoric, of inventions and discoveries, and the protector both of merchants and that allied occupation, to the mythographers' view, of thieves. It is however Hermes' role as psychopomp, the escort of newly deceased souls to the afterlife, that explains the origin of the snakes in the caduceus, since this was also the role of the Sumerian entwined serpent god Ningizzida, with whom Hermes has sometimes been equated.

In Late Antiquity, as the arcane study of alchemy developed, Mercury was understood to be the protector of those arts too and of arcane or occult "Hermetic" information in general. Chemistry and medicines linked the rod of Hermes with the staff of the healer Asclepius, which was wound with a serpent; it was conflated with Mercury's rod, and the modern medical symbol—which should simply be the rod of Asclepius—often became Mercury's wand of commerce. Another version is used in alchemy where the snake is crucified, known as Nicolas Flamel's caduceus. Art historian Walter J. Friedlander, in The Golden Wand of Medicine: A History of the Caduceus Symbol in Medicine (1992), collected hundreds of examples of the caduceus and the rod of Asclepius and found that professional associations were just somewhat more likely to use the staff of Asclepius, while commercial organizations in the medical field were more likely to use the caduceus.

Modern political propaganda
Following the Christian context as a symbol for evil, serpents are sometimes featured in political propaganda. They were used to represent Jews in antisemitic propaganda. Snakes were also used to represent the evil side of drugs in such films as Narcotic and Narcotics: Pit of Despair.

Automobiles
The automobile brands AC Cobra, Ford Mustang Shelby, Zarooq Motors, Dodge Viper, and Alpha Romeo all feature snakes on their logos.

See also
 Adder stone
 Ethnoherpetology
 Glycon
 Legend of the White Snake
 Nehushtan
 Serpent Column
 Snake (zodiac)
 Snakes in Chinese mythology

 References 
 Citations 

 Sources 

 Burston, Daniel: 1994, "Freud, the Serpent & The Sexual Enlightenment of Children", International Forum of Psychoanalysis, vol. 3, pp. 205–219.
 Joseph Campbell, Occidental Mythology: the Masks of God, 1964: Ch. 1, "The Serpent's Bride."
 John Bathurst Deane, The Worship of the Serpent, London : J. G. & F. Rivington, 1833. (alternative copy online at the Internet Archive)
 David P. Chandler, A History of Cambodia, 1992.
 Lewis Richard Farnell, The Cults of the Greek States, 1896.
 Joseph Eddy Fontenrose, Python; a Study of Delphic Myth and Its Origins, 1959.
 Jane Ellen Harrison, Themis: A Study of the Social Origins of Greek Religion, 1912. cf. Chapter IX, p. 329 especially, on the slaying of the Python.
 
 
 
 
 
 Balaji Mundkur, The Cult of the Serpent: An Interdisciplinary Survey of Its Manifestations and Origins, Albany: State University Press 1983.
 Edgar Allan Poe, The Cask of Amontillado, available in an online version at literature.org.
 Carl A. P. Ruck, Blaise Daniel Staples & Clark Heinrich, The Apples of Apollo: Pagan and Christian Mysteries of the Eucharist, 2001.

Further reading
 Behr-Glinka, Andrei I. "Змея как сексуальный и брачный партнер человека. (Еще раз о семантике образа змеи в фольклорной традиции европейских народов)" [Serpent as a Bride and an Intimate Partner of a Man. Once more about the semantics of serpent in European folk-lore]. In: Культурные взаимодействия. Динамика и смыслы. Издательский дом Stratum, Университет «Высшая антропологическая школа», 2016. pp. 435–575.
 Glinka, Lukasz Andrzej (2014). Aryan Unconscious: Archetype of Discrimination, History & Politics,'' Great Abington, UK: Cambridge International Science Publishing. .

External links

 
 
 

Comparative mythology
Greek legendary creatures
 
Snakes
Snakes in art
Snakes in popular culture
Symbolism
ATU 150-199
ATU 400-459
ATU 460-499
ATU 560-649
ATU 650-699